The Bayfield Fish Hatchery is a historic fish hatchery in Salmo, Wisconsin, located  southwest of Bayfield. The hatchery was built in 1897 in the Queen Anne style and Shingle style using local brownstone and played a historically significant role in the fishing industry on Lake Superior. On July 22, 1981, the hatchery was listed on the National Register of Historic Places.

History
Elisha and R.D. Pike owned a private fish hatchery in Bayfield County from the 1860s to 1895. The Wisconsin State Legislature mandated the construction of a fish hatchery in northern Wisconsin in 1895, so R.D. Pike donated  from his hatchery to serve as the state hatchery. The state built the main hatchery building in 1897 using brownstone from nearby Pike's Quarry. The Chicago, St. Paul, Minneapolis and Omaha Railway built a siding to the hatchery, and a special railcar known as The Badger brought fish from the hatchery to Wisconsin waterbodies. In 1974, new buildings and wells were constructed to modernize the hatchery. The hatchery was renamed in honor of longtime Wisconsin Department of Natural Resources secretary Les Voigt in 2006, and the main building was named for R.D. Pike in 2011. The hatchery currently spawns five types of trout and salmon and also includes a visitor's center and aquarium.

References

Government buildings on the National Register of Historic Places in Wisconsin
Queen Anne architecture in Wisconsin
Shingle Style architecture in Wisconsin
Government buildings completed in 1897
Infrastructure completed in 1897
Buildings and structures in Bayfield County, Wisconsin
Fish hatcheries in the United States
Agricultural buildings and structures on the National Register of Historic Places
Agricultural buildings and structures on the National Register of Historic Places in Wisconsin
Agricultural buildings and structures in Wisconsin
National Register of Historic Places in Bayfield County, Wisconsin